Rhéanne Vermette (born 1982), known professionally as Rhayne Vermette, is a Métis filmmaker from Canada. She is most noted for her 2021 film Ste. Anne, which won the Amplify Voices award for Best Canadian Film at the 2021 Toronto International Film Festival.

Originally from Notre-Dame-de-Lourdes, Manitoba, Vermette studied architecture at the University of Manitoba. Her filmmaking style is experimental, typically blending aspects of narrative fiction, animation and documentary into collage films.

She previously wrote and directed the short films R Seymore Goes North (2011), Tudor Village: A One Shot Deal (2012), Rob What (2014) and U.F.O. (2016), and had acting roles in the short film Accidence and the television series Edgar.

References

External links

1982 births
Living people
21st-century Canadian screenwriters
21st-century Canadian women writers
21st-century Canadian actresses
Canadian women film directors
Canadian women screenwriters
Canadian film actresses
Canadian television actresses
Canadian Métis people
Film directors from Manitoba
Actresses from Manitoba
Writers from Manitoba
University of Manitoba alumni
Métis filmmakers